Argiope protensa is a species of the spider genus Argiope known by the common names longtailed orb-weaving spider or tear drop spider. It is found in New Guinea, Australia, New Caledonia and New Zealand.

Gallery

References

External links

Argiope protensa

protensa
Spiders of Oceania
Spiders described in 1872